Rhododendron canescens, the piedmont azalea or mountain azalea, or wild azalea, or native azalea, or dead man’s handkerchief is a pink-blooming azalea native to the Eastern United States.

References

canescens
Endemic flora of the United States
Flora without expected TNC conservation status